Silma Nature Reserve is a nature reserve situated in south-western Estonia, in Lääne County.

Silma nature reserve covers a vast expanse of lagoons, waterways, islets and coastal meadows, making the area an ideal stopover for migratory birds, with up to 24 percent of the area covered in reed beds. It is considered the second most important area for birds in Western Estonia, second only to Matsalu National Park, and of international importance. It owes its unusual geographical and natural features to the very strong post-glacial rebound in the area, creating lakes and lagoons of areas that were until recently parts of the sea. In addition to 225 different observed species of birds, the nature reserve also plays a function as a fish spawning area of great ecological value.

A visitors' centre is located in Saare manor house, and throughout the nature reserve hiking trails and six birdwatching towers have been constructed.

References

Nature reserves in Estonia
Geography of Lääne County
Landforms of Lääne County
Wetlands of Estonia
Tourist attractions in Lääne County
Lääne-Nigula Parish
Ridala Parish